Gertin Hoxhalli (born 5 November 1996) is an Albanian-born Greek professional footballer who plays as an attacking midfielder for Super League 2 club Egaleo.

Club career

Early career
Hoxhalli started his career from Palaia Fokaia-based amateur club Proteas.

Panachaiki
On January 4, 2013, he signed a professional contract with Football League team Panachaiki. He remained in the club for 2,5 seasons, making a total of 28 appearances (27 League, 1 Cup). On 24 July 2015, he signed a 3-years contract with  AEL.

International career
Hoxhalli was also an active international player of Albania U19. He made his debut for the 2015 UEFA European Under-19 Championship qualifiers (Group 7), on 12 November 2014 against Denmark.

Career statistics

Club

References

External links
 
 soccerpunter.com
 sport.me
 footballzz.com
 pelop.gr
 epae.org

1996 births
Living people
Footballers from Korçë
Albanian footballers
Albanian emigrants to Greece
Association football midfielders
Association football forwards
Albania youth international footballers
Panachaiki F.C. players
Athlitiki Enosi Larissa F.C. players
Kallithea F.C. players
Super League Greece players
Football League (Greece) players
Albanian expatriate footballers
Albanian expatriate sportspeople in Greece
Expatriate footballers in Greece